The minister of Intergovernmental Affairs, Infrastructure and Communities is the Minister of the Crown in the Canadian Cabinet who is responsible for the federal government's relations with the governments of the provinces and territories of Canada.  The Minister of Intergovernmental Affairs does not head a full-fledged department, but rather directs the Intergovernmental Affairs Secretariat within the Privy Council Office. The current Minister of Intergovernmental Affairs is Dominic LeBlanc.

Since the post's establishment, all Ministers of Intergovernmental Affairs except Pierre Pettigrew, Prime Minister Justin Trudeau and Chrystia Freeland have concurrently served as President of the Queen's Privy Council for Canada.

Prior to the creation of full ministers responsible for this file, prime ministers occasionally appointed Ministers of State for Federal-Provincial Relations. That was the case from 1977 to 1980 and from 1986 to 1991. From 1991 to 1993, the Minister responsible for Constitutional Affairs served a similar role focused on intergovernmental negotiation of a package of constitutional reforms. The resulting package, the Charlottetown Accord, was defeated in a 1992 referendum.

Several provincial governments, such as Ontario, Manitoba and Quebec, have also created homologous ministerial positions responsible for relations with other provinces and the federal government.

List of ministers
Key:

Minister of Infrastructure and Communities
From 2015 to 2021, the responsibilities for infrastructure and communities were assigned its own ministry.

Key:

References

External links
Intergovernmental Affairs, Government of Canada
Canadian Intergovernmental Conference Secretariat

Intergovernmental Affairs